The small forward (SF), also known as the three or swingman, is one of the five positions in a regulation basketball game. Small forwards are typically shorter, quicker, and leaner than power forwards and centers but taller, larger, and stronger than either of the guard positions. They are strategic and are often relied upon to score, defend, create open lanes, and rebound for their team.

The small forward is considered to be perhaps the most versatile of the five main basketball positions as they contribute offensively and defensively. In the NBA, small forwards generally range from 6' 5" (1.96 m) to 6' 10" (2.08 m); in the WNBA, they are usually between 6' 0" (1.83 m) to 6' 2" (1.88 m). This puts them at the average height of all professional basketball players because they are taller than the guards, but shorter than the power forward and center. 

Small forwards are responsible for scoring points and defending, and often are secondary or tertiary rebounders behind the power forward and center. In professional basketball, some have considerable passing responsibilities, and many are prolific scorers. 

The styles with which small forwards score vary widely. Some are very accurate shooters, and some prefer to initiate physical contact with opposing players, such as Kevin Durant while others are primarily slashers who also possess jump shots. In some cases, small forwards position on the baseline; in other cases, they operate as off-ball specialists. The defensive specialists among them are notably versatile, often being able to guard multiple positions using their size, speed, and strength. Having adequate footwork and a solid defensive stance contributes to why small forwards are successful.  When it comes to statistics, small forwards must be all over the map and at least have stats in every category.

There are many excellent small forwards that are well known for their contributions and versatility. Small forwards inducted in the Naismith Memorial Basketball Hall of Fame include Julius Erving, Larry Bird, James Worthy, Elgin Baylor, John Havlicek, Scottie Pippen, Alex English, Bernard King, Chris Mullin, Dominique Wilkins, Rick Barry, Grant Hill, Tamika Catchings, Cheryl Miller, and Sheryl Swoopes.

References

Basketball positions